Pujun Beilu Station is a metro station on the Guangfo Line (FMetro Line 1). located under  Zhaoxiang Road just west of its junction Pujun North Road and Shidongxia Road in the Chancheng District of Foshan, near Zhaoxiang Park and the Guangdong Cantonese Opera Museum. It was completed on 3November 2010.

Station layout

Exits

References

Foshan Metro stations
Railway stations in China opened in 2010
Guangzhou Metro stations